Shan Xiongxin (? - 5 June 621) was a general, top warrior and peasant uprising leader during the transitional era between Sui and Tang dynasties.

In history
Shan Xiongxin was born in Caoxian, Shandong region. He possessed great physical strength and specialised in the use of spears; he was nicknamed "Flying General" (飛將) for his martial prowess. When the uprising of Wagang Army broke out in 613, Shan Xiongxin and his friend Xu Shiji joined this peasant rebellion. Due to his bravery, he was soon promoted to become a general in the peasant army. In 617, after the highest power of the Wagang Army shifted from Zhai Rang to Li Mi, Shan Xiongxin was promoted to Left Wuhou General. After an internal struggle, Li Mi killed Zhai Rang. Li Mi's advisor Fang Yanzao suggested that Li Mi should kill Shan Xiongxin because Shan was a close follower to Zhai Rang. However, Li Mi did not kill Shan Xiongxin because he liked Shan's talent. 

In 618, Shan Xiongxin took part in the battle between Wagang Army and Yuwen Huaji, who just executed the Emperor Yang of Sui earlier in the same year. Yuwen Huaji was seriously weakened in this battle and would finally be defeated by Dou Jiande. Later, Wagang Army started to fight against Wang Shichong, the warlord based in Luoyang. Li Mi underestimated Wang Shichong's strength and was defeated in Yanshi. Shan Xiongxin surrendered to Wang Shichong.

Wang Shichong named Shan Xiongxin as his grand general. In 620, Tang forces, led by Li Shimin, started to attack Wang Shichong, aiming to wipe him out and reunify China. Shan Xiongxin was the most reliable general fighting for Wang Shichong during this campaign. When Li Shimin was touring the Xuanwuling to inspect the frontline, Shan Xiongxin charged forth and engaged Li Shimin in a duel, and almost killed him. However, Li Shimin's follower Yuchi Jingde arrived in time and defeated Shan Xiongxin. 

After the Battle of Hulao, Wang Shichong surrendered to Tang Dynasty. Shan was captured by Li Shimin and was executed. Before the execution, his friend Xu Shiji, who surrendered to Tang Dynasty after the collapse of Wagang Army, tried to save him by persuading Li Shimin that Shan was one of the best warriors in the region who could be useful for Tang. However, Li Shimin had made his mind on killing Shan Xiongxin. Xu Shiji met Shan Xiongxin in the prison for the last time and cried. He cut off a piece of his flesh from the leg and asked Shan Xiongxin to swallow it, so that he could be always with Shan Xiongxin.

In popular culture

Shan Xiongxin is one of the most important figures in folk tales about the Sui and Tang dynasties. In the legend, Xiongxin was said to be his courtesy name while his given name was Shan Tong. He was one of the top-tier warriors at that time and was known for his bravery and generous. His weapon was a lance with golden nails. He had an elder brother named Shan Xiongzhong, who was accidentally killed by Li Yuan, who later became the founding emperor of Tang dynasty. Shan brothers were said to be gang heads in Hebei area with good reputations on helping poor people and punish bad officials. When Qin Shubao was in trouble, Shan Xiongxin tried his best to help Qin. Later, both Shan and Qin joined Wagang Army. After the Wagang failed, Qin Shubao submitted to Tang dynasty. However, because the Tang emperor killed his brother, Shan refused to do so. He became a son-in-law of Wang Shichong. After battles at Luoyang, Shan Xiongxin was captured by Li Shimin. Li Shimin apologized his father's fault to Shan Xiongxin, hoping Shan would submit to Tang. However, Shan still refused to surrender. Li Shimin had to execute him.

In some versions of a legend, Yeon Gaesomun, the general of Goguryeo, was said to be the next life of Shan Xiongxin. In the legend, he had at least one son called Shan Tianchang, who submitted to Tang dynasty later, and was finally killed in a battle against Turkic Khaganate.

Family
Ancestor:
Shan Kuang: Local governor of Jiyin in Han Dynasty
Son:
Shan Daozhen: Sima (vice governor) of Liangzhou in Tang Dynasty
Grandsons:
Shan Sijing: Commander of the Protectorate to Pacify the East in Tang Dynasty
Shan Sili
Shan Siyuan: Governor of Qizhou in Tang Dynasty
Notable Great Grandsons:
Shan Youling: Teacher of the Crown Prince
Shan Buxian
Shan Guangye
After 11 generations:
Brothers Shan Xing, Shan Wang, Shan Mao and Shan Sheng: Key members of Huang Chao's uprising

References

Sui dynasty generals
Tang dynasty people
Transition from Sui to Tang
620 deaths
Chinese duellists